Hexahydrocannabinol (HHC) is a hydrogenated derivative of tetrahydrocannabinol. It is a naturally occurring phytocannabinoid that has rarely been identified as a trace component in Cannabis sativa, but can also be produced synthetically by hydrogenation of cannabis extracts. HHC was first synthesized in 1947 by Roger Adams using natural THC found in Cannabis sativa. Several research groups have successfully synthesized (+)-HHC and (-)-HHC using citronellal and olivetol, as well as other related compounds. While similar compounds have previously been identified in cannabis, hexahydrocannabinol itself has rarely been isolated from the plant. The de Las Heras group in 2020 took lipid extract from Cannabis sativa seeds and discovered 43 cannabinoids in the crude extract; one of them being hexahydrocannabinol. It has two diastereomers at the methyl (9) position. HHC is typically made from Δ8-THC, or Δ9-THC. There are no double bonds in the cyclohexyl ring like D8/D9 have—they have been removed from the structure and hydrogens have been added to the compound. Similar structural analogs of HHC have been demonstrated to bind to the CB1 receptor and produce cannabinoid effects in animals, with the 9β-HHC enantiomer being much more active than 9α-HHC. While HHC has been shown to bind to the CB1 receptor, it binds with weaker affinity than THC, which has typically been an indication that it is not as intoxicating as typical THC. Since HHC is found naturally in the cannabis plant, humans have likely been unknowingly consuming small amounts of this cannabinoid for centuries.

Several structurally related HHC analogs have been found to be naturally occurring in Cannabis including cannabiripsol, 9α-hydroxyhexahydrocannabinol, 7-oxo-9α-hydroxyhexa-hydrocannabinol, 10α-hydroxyhexahydrocannabinol, 10aR-hydroxyhexahydrocannabinol and 1′S-hydroxycannabinol, 10α-hydroxy-Δ(9,11)-hexahydrocannabinol and 9β,10β-epoxyhexahydrocannabinol.

HHC itself has been found as a degradation byproduct of THC in a similar way that Cannabinol and Delta-8-THC can be formed by the Cannabis plant from Delta-9-THC degradation. The degradation of D9-THC that forms HHC is the reduction of the double carbon bonds that would typically make up the delta isomer position on THCs structure.

Delta-9-THC was discovered to partly metabolize into 11-Hydroxy-THC and alpha,10 alpha-epoxy-hexahydrocannabinol along with 1,2-epoxy-hexahydrocannabinol. Cannabidiol was discovered to partly metabolize into 9α-hydroxy-HHC and 8-hydroxy-iso-HHC inside the body. In the presence of alcohol, the methoxy or ethoxy analogs such as 9-methoxy-HHC, 10-methoxy-HHC, 9-ethoxy-HHC and 10-ethoxy-HHC can be formed.

Hexahydrocannabinol should not be confused with the related compounds 9-Nor-9β-hydroxyhexahydrocannabinol (9-Nor-9Beta-HHC) or 9-Hydroxyhexahydrocannabinol (9-OH-HHC) or 11-Hydroxyhexahydrocannabinol (11-OH-HHC and 7-OH-HHC), all of which have also sometimes been referred to as "HHC".

See also 
 7,8-Dihydrocannabinol
 11-Hydroxyhexahydrocannabinol
 Cannabinol
 Delta-6-Cannabidiol
 9-Nor-9β-hydroxyhexahydrocannabinol
 9-Hydroxyhexahydrocannabinol
 HU-243
 Canbisol
 Delta-8-THC
 Delta-10-THC
 Delta-11-THC
 Tetrahydrocannabiphorol
 THC-O-acetate

References 

Benzochromenes
Cannabinoids